Commemorative coins in Romania are special coins minted by the State Mint and issued by the National Bank of Romania (the only issuer of the Romanian coins).

1906

1941

1944 

Since there is no value given, some consider this a medal and not a coin. It respects all the technical specifications of a 20 lei gold coin in force at the time of issue.

1982 - 1983

1995

1996

1997

1998

1999

2000

2001

2002

2003

2004

2005

2006

2007

2008

2009

2010

2011

2012

2013

2014

References 
 National Bank website

Lists of commemorative coins
Coins of Romania